The 2020–21 Vijay Hazare Trophy was the 19th season of the Vijay Hazare Trophy, a List A cricket tournament in India. It was contested by 38 teams, divided into six groups, with eight teams in the Plate Group. Arunachal Pradesh, Assam, Manipur, Meghalaya, Mizoram, Nagaland, Sikkim and Uttarakhand were placed in the Plate Group, with all the matches taking place in Tamil Nadu. Uttarakhand won the Plate Group to qualify for the Eliminator match in the tournament.

Points table

Fixtures

Round 1

Round 2

Round 3

Round 4

Round 5

References

Vijay Hazare Trophy
Vijay Hazare Trophy